72 Pegasi is a binary star system in the northern constellation of Pegasus. It is visible to the naked eye as a faint, orange-hued point of light with a combined apparent visual magnitude of 4.97. The system is located approximately 550 light years away from the Sun, based on parallax, but is drifting closer with a radial velocity of −25 km/s.

This is a visual binary with an orbital period of roughly 492 years and an eccentricity of 0.32. The two stars are relatively similar and are about twice the mass of the Sun each. The primary star, 72 Pegasi A, is an evolved K-type giant with a visual magnitude of 5.67.

References

K-type giants
Binary stars
Pegasus (constellation)
Durchmusterung objects
Pegasi, 72
221673
116310
8943
Suspected variables